Khel ( Game) is a 1992 Indian Hindi language romantic comedy film directed by Rakesh Roshan. It stars Mala Sinha, Anil Kapoor, Madhuri Dixit, Sonu Walia, Anupam Kher as main cast. Khel is one of the almost dozen films that Anil Kapoor and Madhuri Dixit have done together. The script was heavily inspired from 1988 Hollywood comedy Dirty Rotten Scoundrels. Khel was filmed in the beautiful locales of Nairobi, in Kenya.

Synopsis
A rich widow Sulakshana Devi (Mala Sinha) lives with her son Ravi (Vijayendra Ghatge) and care-taker Balwant (Prem Chopra). One day, she receives the news that her son has died in a car accident. Meanwhile, a lady named Kamini approaches her and informs her that she is carrying her dead son Ravi's, child. Sulakshana does not believe Kamini and turns her away. Sulakshana later learns from Ravi's friend Sanjay Gupta (Vivek Vaswani) that Kamini is indeed the mother of Ravi's child. Sulakshana tries her best to look for Kamini and get her home but to no avail.

Years later, Sulakshana comes across a young man Arun (Anil Kapoor) who retrieves her purse from a thief. Happy with his honesty, Sulakshana offers Arun a job. Little does she know that Arun is, in fact, a crook with his eyes and heart set on her multi-crore property.

While Arun gets busy hatching plots to seize her property, Seema (Madhuri Dixit) and her uncle (Anupam Kher) enter the scene. Then follows a series of comic events and a love triangle between Arun, Seema and Tara Jaisingh (Sonu Walia).

It is revealed that Ravi's death was not an accident in the first place. What is the truth that awaits Sulakshana?

Cast
Mala Sinha as Sulakshana
Anil Kapoor as Arun / Devdas
Madhuri Dixit as Seema
Sonu Walia as Tara Singh
Bharati as Kamini / Sharda
Anupam Kher as Seema's Uncle
Prem Chopra as Balwant
Sujit Kumar as Father / Principal 
Vijayendra Ghatge as Ravi
Dinesh Hingoo as Hasmukh
Satyendra Kapoor as Mr. Sinha
Satish Kaul as Vinod Mishra
Aparajita as Shanti Mishra  
Bharat Kapoor as Vinod's Elder Brother
Yunus Parvez as Seth Mangatram

Soundtrack
"Na Hai Zameen, Na Aasman" is lifted from "sending all my love" by The Linear whereas "Ek Baat Maan Lo Tum" is copied from "Minnie the Moocher" by Cab Calloway .

Awards
 Filmafare Award for Best Comedian - Anupam Kher

References

External links

1992 films
1990s Hindi-language films
1992 romantic comedy films
Films directed by Rakesh Roshan
Films scored by Rajesh Roshan
Indian romantic comedy films
Indian remakes of American films